Brånevatnet ("Melting lake") is a lake at Nordaustlandet, Svalbard. It is located between Winsnesbreen and Oxfordhalvøya, to the north of Etonbreen. The river of Oxfordelva flows from Brånevatnet through Oxfordhalvøya and debouches into Bodleybukta.

References

Lakes of Svalbard
Nordaustlandet